Mark Drakeford (born 19 September 1954) is a Welsh politician serving as First Minister of Wales and Leader of Welsh Labour since 2018. He previously served in the Welsh Government as Cabinet Secretary for Finance from 2016 to 2018 and Minister for Health and Social Services from 2013 to 2016. Drakeford was first elected as the Member of the Senedd (MS) for Cardiff West in 2011.

Drakeford was born in Carmarthen in West Wales. He studied Latin at the University of Kent and the University of Exeter. He was a lecturer at the University College of Swansea from 1991 to 1995 and at Cardiff University from 1995 to 1999. He was a Professor of Social Policy and Applied Social Sciences at Cardiff University from 2003 to 2013.

Drakeford was elected at the 2011 National Assembly for Wales election for Cardiff West. In 2013, First Minister Carwyn Jones appointed Drakeford to the Welsh Government as Minister for Health and Social Services. He served as Cabinet Secretary for Finance from 2016 to 2018 and as Minister for Brexit from 2017 to 2018. In 2018, he was elected to succeed Jones as Welsh Labour Leader and First Minister. He has led the Welsh Government’s response to the COVID-19 pandemic. In the 2021 Senedd election, Drakeford led Welsh Labour to win 30 seats, a working majority, and was reappointed as First Minister.

Drakeford is widely considered to belong to the left wing of the Labour Party, and is supported by some members of Welsh Labour Grassroots and Momentum. He was the only sitting Cabinet member in any part of the UK to support Jeremy Corbyn in his bid for the national leadership of the Labour Party in 2015, while he was Minister for Health and Social Services.

Early life and education
Mark Drakeford was born and brought up in Carmarthenshire, West Wales. He was educated at Queen Elizabeth Grammar School, then an all-boys grammar school in Carmarthen. He studied Latin at the University of Kent, and graduated from the University of Exeter.

After university, he trained both as a teacher and as a social worker. He moved to Cardiff in 1979 and worked as a probation officer and a youth justice worker, including as a Barnardo's project leader in the Ely and Caerau communities. His experiences working with young people in deprived areas inspired him to help establish the Welsh youth homelessness charity Llamau in the late 1980s.

Academic career
From 1991 to 1995, Drakeford was a lecturer in applied social studies at the University College of Swansea (now Swansea University). He then moved to the University of Wales, Cardiff, renamed as Cardiff University in 1999, as a lecturer in its School of Social and Administrative Studies. He was promoted to senior lecturer in 1999 and appointed as Professor of Social Policy and Applied Social Sciences in 2003. Drakeford continued in his academic posts until his appointment as a Welsh Government minister in 2013. He has published books and journal articles on various aspects of social policy.

Political career

Drakeford has always been interested in politics, which he says was part of the fabric of life in 1960s Carmarthenshire. He has also stated that he was 'always Labour', believing that a person's ties to the economy are the great determining factor in their life chances. In addition to his membership of the Labour Party, he is a member of Unite the Union and UNISON, and a solidarity member of LGBT+ Labour. He is a staunch opponent of Britain's Trident nuclear programme and has called for its decommissioning.

From 1985 to 1993, Drakeford represented the Pontcanna ward on South Glamorgan County Council, with fellow future Welsh Assembly members Jane Hutt and Jane Davidson as his ward colleagues. He served as Chair of the Education Committee and took a particular interest in Welsh-medium education.

Having been part of the successful Yes for Wales campaign in the 1997 Welsh devolution referendum, he was selected as the Labour candidate for Cardiff Central at the first Welsh Assembly election, as part of Labour's ‘twinned seats’ policy. The seat was won by the Liberal Democrats' Jenny Randerson.

Following Rhodri Morgan’s appointment as First Minister in 2000, Drakeford became the Welsh Government’s special advisor on health and social policy, and later served as the head of Morgan’s political office. He had been close with Morgan for a number of years, having been Morgan's election agent when he was elected to the UK Parliament. In his role as a special advisor, Drakeford was one of the principal architects of the 'Clear Red Water' philosophy, which made a distinction between Labour Party policy under Morgan in Wales and under Tony Blair in Westminster.

Drakeford succeeded Morgan as the Assembly Member for Cardiff West when the latter retired at the 2011 election. Soon after, he became Chair of the Assembly's Health and Social Care Committee and of the All-Wales Programme Monitoring Committee for European Funds.

In 2013, he was invited by First Minister Carwyn Jones to join the Government, replacing Lesley Griffiths as Minister for Health and Social Services. His appointment was welcomed by the British Medical Association and the Royal College of Nursing. As Health Minister, he guided both the Human Transplantation Act and the Nurse Staffing Levels Act through the Senedd.

In a reshuffle after the 2016 election, he became Cabinet Secretary for Finance and Local Government. His portfolio was later changed, as he assumed responsibility for the Welsh Government’s Brexit preparations and responsibility for local government was transferred to Alun Davies.

At the UK Labour Party's conference in September 2022, Drakeford used his speech at conference to in part hail the benefits of electoral reform. He has been a long term advocate for using proportional representation at general elections.

Welsh Labour leadership

Immediately following Carwyn Jones' announcement on 21 April 2018 that he intended to resign as party leader and First Minister, Drakeford told BBC Wales he was giving a leadership bid ‘serious consideration’. Two days later, he announced that he would seek to be a candidate in the ensuing leadership contest. He immediately secured the public support of seven other Labour AMs, taking him beyond the threshold of nominations needed to get onto the ballot. Prior to Jones giving written notice of his resignation on 26 September, a further nine Labour AMs announced they would be nominating Drakeford, meaning a majority of the Labour Group in the Senedd would be supporting his candidacy. He later received support from 10 MPs, eight trade unions and 24 Constituency Labour Parties.

At a special conference on 15 September 2018, it was decided that the voting system for Welsh Labour leadership elections would be changed to a variation of one member, one vote – a change for which Drakeford had been campaigning for over 20 years.

Early policy proposals from Drakeford's leadership campaign included a pilot for universal baby bundles and a push for the devolution of the Probation Service. At the north Wales launch of his campaign, he set out plans for a Social Partnership Act to protect employment rights, and plans to establish a Community Bank for Wales. During an interview, Drakeford said that he was a republican, and had been since the age of 14. According to ITV Wales, were he elected, Drakeford would have a "working relationship with the Royal Family", but did not feel that his views would be "an issue."

On 6 December 2018, it was announced that Drakeford had been elected as the leader of the Welsh Labour Party in succession to Carwyn Jones. He received 46.9% of the vote in the first round of the contest, and 53.9% in the second round compared to 41.4% for Vaughan Gething.

First Minister 

Mark Drakeford was nominated by AMs as First Minister designate on 12 December and his nomination was approved by the Queen. He named his government the following day. He was appointed as a Privy Counsellor on 10 January 2019.

COVID-19 pandemic 

As First Minister, Drakeford has responded to the COVID-19 pandemic in Wales. Many aspects of handling COVID-19 were the responsibility of the Welsh Government, including the setting of restrictions on everyday life designed to curtail the virus. According to research conducted by University College London for its COVID-19 Social Study, Drakeford's leadership led to better understanding of the rules in Wales than Boris Johnson's did in England.

On 23 March 2020, UK Prime Minister Boris Johnson, having the agreement of all devolved governments, announced a lockdown of the United Kingdom, with only essential services remaining open. This announcement was followed by First Minister Drakeford announcing that the measures would also cover Wales and would come into effect from that evening. The measures put in place restricted people from leaving their home for non-essential travel, with outside exercise limited to once a day. The measures that controlled exercise outside the home differed from those in England, where the measures in place did not stipulate a once-a-day restriction, whereas the Welsh version specifically limited exercise outside the home to once a day, with the maximum fine being £120, compared to £960 in England. On 20 May, the Government announced that the maximum fine would be increased to £1,920.

On 25 March the Coronavirus Act 2020 was given Royal Assent, after passing through both Houses in the Parliament of the United Kingdom. The following day the Health Protection (Coronavirus, Restrictions) (Wales) Regulations 2020 were approved by the Senedd, giving the Welsh Government emergency powers to deal with various aspects of managing the pandemic.

Though Drakeford was supportive of a cooperative approach between the various governments of the UK, his government also at times took significantly different decisions such as introducing a two-week "firebreak" lockdown in Wales during October 2020 at a point when the UK government was still operating a system of localised restrictions in England.

2021 Senedd Election 
In the 2021 Senedd election, Labour ran on a manifesto which included various schemes to improve health and social care provision such as investing in mental health services, a new medical school in North Wales and an eventual move towards free-at-point-of-use social care ideally as part of a UK-wide reform. In education, promised policies included tutoring staff to help pupils catch up after the pandemic, funding to improve school facilities, increasing eligibility for free school meals to an unspecified number of children, expanding access to Welsh-medium education and potential reform to the school routine. Other plans included more reforestation, more social housing and possible electoral reform for Senedd elections.
Labour equalled its best ever result, falling one seat short of an overall majority, which has never been achieved in the institution. The BBC reporter Adrian Browne credited the outcome to Mark Drakeford and approval of his handling of the COVID-19 pandemic in Wales.  Pollster Ben Walker wrote in a piece for the New Statesman that one of the factors which had contributed to Labour's success at the election was that Drakeford had developed a greater profile among the public in Wales during the COVID-19 pandemic and was perceived as competent and the best potential First Minister. Various commentators suggested that Welsh Labour's success at the election was part of a wider trend in the round of elections which took place across Britain at the same time of incumbents being rewarded and that there were also more long-term factors which placed Labour in a better position to succeed in Wales than elsewhere.

In November 2021, Drakeford and Plaid Cymru leader Adam Price reached a co-operation agreement on policy in a wide range of areas. Ideas they planned to implement included free-at-the-point-of-use social care, expanding services for children, and restrictions on second homes. The deal was the third time Welsh Labour and Plaid Cymru had agreed to work together in the era of devolution.

Personal life
Drakeford was married to Clare Buckle from 1977 until her death in 2023, at the age of 71. They had three children. During the COVID-19 pandemic, Drakeford had moved into a building in the couple's back garden, in order to protect Clare and her mother, who were both classed as vulnerable.

Selected works

References

External links
 People of the Senedd – Member details

1954 births
Academics of Cardiff University
Academics of Swansea University
Alumni of the University of Exeter
Alumni of the University of Kent
Articles containing video clips
Councillors in Cardiff
Labour Co-operative members of the Senedd
Living people
Members of South Glamorgan County Council
Ministers for Finance of Wales
People educated at Queen Elizabeth High School, Carmarthen
People from Carmarthen
Politicians from Cardiff
Wales AMs 2011–2016
Wales MSs 2016–2021
Wales MSs 2021–2026
Welsh republicans
Welsh socialists
Welsh-speaking politicians